Thomas Harvey (by 1512 – 1577 or later) was an English politician.

He was a Member (MP) of the Parliament of England for New Shoreham in March 1553, Orford in October 1553, and Midhurst in November 1554 and 1558.

References

Year of death missing
Year of birth uncertain
English MPs 1553 (Edward VI)
English MPs 1553 (Mary I)
English MPs 1554–1555
English MPs 1558